The Sad Orange Land is a collection of stories by the Palestinian writer Ghassan Kanafani, it is the second stories collection. originally published in 1962, in which he attempted to convey the Palestinian character in the face of its fate both within the Palestinian interior, such as stories:

 Paper from Ramla
 Paper from Ghaza  
 Forbidden Weapons
 The Horizon Behind the Gate

Writer 
Ghassan Kanafani (born in Acre on 8 April 1936 and died in Beirut on 8 July 1972) he was a famous Palestinian novelist, narrator and journalist of the twentieth century  who was assassinated by the Israeli intelligence service Mossad on 8 July 1972 when he was 36 years old by detonating his car in the Hazmiyeh area near Beirut.

As a member of the popular Front for the Liberation of Palestine's political bureau, he focused on Palestinian emancipation.He and his family were forced to evacuate in1948, and he spent time in Syria before settling in Lebanon, where he obtained Lebanese citizenship. In1952, he graduated from high school in Damascus with a Syrian baccalaureate.In the same year, he enrolled in the college of Arab Literature at Damascus University, but dropped out at the end of the second year to join the Movement of Arab Nationalists, which George Habash joined in meeting them in 1953. He worked in the primary education in Kuwait, then proceeded to Beirut to work for Freedom Magazine (Al-hourriah magazine) (1961), where he was in charge of the magazine's cultural department, before becoming editor-in-chief of a newspaper in Lebanon (Editor) in which he issued (Palestine Supplement). When the Popular Front for the Liberation of Palestine (PFLP) was created in1967, he went to work for the Lebanese newspaper Al-Anwar. Ghassan presided over the liberation of his journal, which he named "Target Magazine".

He had two sons, Fayiz and Laila, with a Danish woman named (Anne).He was diagnosed with diabetes at a young age. Bassam Abu Sharif received the magazine's editorial after his martyrdom.

Included stories collection 

 Beyond Borders (original title: Ābʿd mn ālḥdwd)  
 The horizon behind the gate (original title: ālāwfwq wārāʾ ālbwābā)
 Forbidden Weapon ( original title: ālāwfwq wārāʾ ālbwābā)
 3 papers from Palestine (original title:ṯlāṯẗ āwrāq mēn flsṭyn(:

 Paper from Ramla (original title: wārāqā mēn ālrāmlā)
 Paper from Bird(original title:wārāqā mēn ālṭyrā )
 Paper from Gaza (original title: wārāqā mēn ġāzā)

 Green and Red(original title: ālāẖḍr w ālāḥmr):

 Fight(original title: ālnēzāl)
 Death Schedule (original title: ḥdwl ālmwtt)
 Death to rival (original title: ālmwt llnād)

 The sad Orange Land
 Fuse in Mosul (original title: ftyl fy ālmwṣl )
 None( original title: lā šyʾ)

References 

1962 short story collections
Works by Ghassan Kanafani